Bob Mabaso is a South African politician who was Gauteng's Member of the Executive Council for Social Development from 2004 to 2006. He represented the African National Congress (ANC) in the Gauteng Provincial Legislature for ten years before that. He is also a former leader of the South African Communist Party (SACP) in Gauteng.

Political career 
Mabaso was first elected to the Gauteng Provincial Legislature in 1994 and he was the Chief Whip of the Majority Party, the ANC, in the legislature from 1994 to 2001. After his re-election to the provincial legislature in the 2004 general election, he was appointed to the Gauteng Executive Council by Mbhazima Shilowa, who was then the Premier of Gauteng.

On 27 January 2006, Shilowa announced that he had accepted Mabaso's resignation, tendered the day before. Shilowa said that he had received "a complaint relating to allegations of sexual harassment" against Mabaso. Mabaso said that he denied having committed any act of sexual harassment but had resigned due to the seriousness the government attached to the allegations.

The opposition Democratic Alliance welcomed Mabaso's resignation, saying "we suspect these allegations have given Shilowa a convenient way of getting rid of Mabaso without having to admit to the massive failure of delivery by [Mabaso's] department". Health MEC Gwen Ramokgopa was appointed to take over his portfolio in an acting capacity, and a permanent replacement, Kgaogelo Lekgoro, was announced on 23 March. Mabaso also stepped down as a Member of the Provincial Legislature. In addition, he was the incumbent Provincial Chairperson of the SACP in Gauteng, having been re-elected to that position in July 2004; although the SACP initially said he would retain the position, he also resigned as Provincial Chairperson.

The details of the sexual harassment complaint were not initially released, but Mabaso later said that the complainant was Nonqaba Mosunkutu, the wife of his former colleague in the Executive Council, Khabisi Mosunkutu, and a family friend; he said she had accused him of attempting to rape her in November 2005. In October 2006, the National Prosecuting Authority declined to prosecute Mabaso; by January 2007, he had also been cleared in an internal ANC process.

Personal life 
As of 2006, Mabaso was married to Elizabeth, with whom he had four children.

References 

Living people
African National Congress politicians
Members of the Gauteng Provincial Legislature
Members of the South African Communist Party
Year of birth missing (living people)